The 38th running of the Tour of Flanders cycling classic was held on Sunday, 4 April 1954. Belgian Raymond Impanis won the race in a two-man sprint with French rider François Mahé. 38 of 230 riders finished.

Route
The race started in Ghent and finished in Wetteren – totaling 255 km. The course featured five categorized climbs:
 Kluisberg
 Kwaremont
 Kruisberg
 Edelareberg
 Kloosterstraat (Geraardsbergen)

Results

References

1954
Tour of Flanders
Tour of Flanders
Tour of Flanders
Tour of Flanders